Knoxville is an unincorporated community and census-designated place in Crawford County, Georgia, United States. It is the Crawford County seat. The community is part of the Macon Metropolitan Statistical Area. As of the 2020 census, Knoxville had a population of 65.

Knoxville was founded in 1823 as seat of the newly formed Crawford County. It was incorporated as a town in 1825. The former city's municipal charter was dissolved in 1995 pursuant to a Georgia law which abolished city governments which were defunct or minimally operative.

There are three National Register of Historic Places in Knoxville, which are the Crawford County Courthouse, the Crawford County Jail, and the Georgia Post Building.

History

Naming
There is confusion as to whom Knoxville was named for. Historians who rely on old records and spoken traditions have pointed to General Henry Knox, who served in the Continental Army under George Washington, though General Knox had no ties to the state of Georgia, and had been deceased for 15 years at the time of naming (c. 1821). Some historians argue that the town was named for Hugh Knox, a stagecoach operator who delivered mail along the Federal Wire Line through the future location of Knoxville. Knox owned a half-way house, where travelers could rest and swap horses, called the Knox House. Since there is no solid evidence of either of these men being the namesake of the town, the subject is left open to individual interpretation.

Beginnings
On December 23, 1822, the Georgia legislature directed Crawford County's Inferior Court to select a county seat and build a courthouse. Considering Knoxville was centrally located in the county, and also rested along the Federal Wire Road, it was decided on December 10, 1823, that Knoxville should become the county seat. The house of a local resident was used as a temporary courthouse until a permanent one was built, which occurred c.1825. But, in an apparent act of arson, the courthouse was leveled in 1830, destroying all court and county records. A second courthouse was completed in 1831, which still stands today as a museum and home to the Crawford County Historical Society. In 1832 a jail was built in Knoxville, but was torn down in 1839 due to a grand jury presentment declaring that this jail was not fit for use. Therefore, in 1843 another jail was built, though, in 1887, this jail, now 44 years old, was itself declared unfit for use and torn down. A third jail was completed by 1888, which stands to this day.

Rise and Fall
On January 2, 1827, Knoxville Academy opened, the town's first school. In 1888 The Knoxville Journal was founded. Publisher Percy V. Howell printed advertisements for the sale of real estate in the as-yet-unnamed town of Roberta, which was speculated to become a boomtown. Yet, by 1892, The Crawford County Herald was the official newspaper of Crawford County, and was published in Roberta rather than Knoxville. Knoxville's population by 1886 numbered around 200, but was expected to increase to 3,000.
The A&F Railroad, also known as the Atlanta and Hawkinsville Railroad, missed Knoxville to the southwest by about one mile. This is believed to be the result of local opposition of out-of-state intruders penetrating Knoxville. A new railroad station began to be built around this time, in the area which would later become Roberta. Inhabitants of Knoxville began the one-mile shift to Roberta once the new railroad was completed, dooming Knoxville's growth. Thenceforth, Knoxville was merely a community that held the title of county seat.

1995 Municipal Charter Law
In 1993 the Georgia Legislature passed a law detailing the minimum requirements for a city to remain incorporated in Georgia, resulting, in 1995, in Knoxville's unincorporation.

Geography
Knoxville is located in central Crawford County and is bordered to the west by the city of Roberta, the only incorporated place in the county. U.S. Route 80 passes through Knoxville, leading east 25 mi (40 km) to Macon    and west 70 mi (113 km) to Columbus. Georgia State Route 42 also runs through the community, leading southeast 18 mi (29 km) to Byron and west to Roberta with U.S. 80.

Demographics

2020 census

Note: the US Census treats Hispanic/Latino as an ethnic category. This table excludes Latinos from the racial categories and assigns them to a separate category. Hispanics/Latinos can be of any race.

Notable people
Knoxville is the birthplace of John Pemberton, the inventor of Coca-Cola, although he moved to Columbus, Georgia, while a child.
Knoxville was also home to Joanna Troutman, a young girl who sewed a single star on a white banner to give to a battalion of Georgia troops headed west to assist Texas citizens in their fight for independence.

References

Former municipalities in Georgia (U.S. state)
Unincorporated communities in Crawford County, Georgia
Census-designated places in Crawford County, Georgia
County seats in Georgia (U.S. state)
Macon metropolitan area, Georgia
Populated places disestablished in 1995